Nathan Lewis Miller (October 10, 1868 – June 26, 1953) was an American lawyer and politician who was Governor of New York from 1921 to 1922.

Early life and education
Nathan Miller was born on October 10, 1868, the son of Samuel Miller, a tenant farmer, and Almira Russell Miller. He attended Groton Union School, and graduated from Cortland Normal School in 1887. While at Cortland Normal School, Nathan Miller was in Gamma Sigma Fraternity. He studied law in Cortland, New York, and was admitted to the bar in 1893.

Career
Miller entered politics as a Republican, and started his political career in Cortland as corporation counsel. He later moved to corporate law, and his rise in politics was strongly helped by his relationship with Andrew Carnegie and the United States Steel Corporation. Miller helped to effect the mergers that created this early mega-corporation. The merger helped Carnegie get out of the steel business and make him one of the richest men in the world at the time.

Miller was New York State Comptroller from 1901 to 1903, first appointed to fill the unexpired term of Erastus C. Knight who had been elected Mayor of Buffalo, and in November 1902 elected to a full term.

He resigned the comptrollership in 1903, and was appointed to the New York Supreme Court, where he served from 1903 to 1915. In 1904, he was designated to the Appellate Division. On January 13, 1913, he was designated an associate judge of the New York Court of Appeals under the amendment of 1899, but resigned from the bench on July 30, 1915. He served as president of the New York State Bar Association in 1920. He nominated Herbert Hoover for president at the 1920 Republican National Convention.

Governor of New York
Miller was Governor of New York from 1921 to 1922, elected in 1920. As governor he instituted numerous economy measures, and he estimated that he had saved taxpayers $20 million. Against opposition from New York City Mayor John F. Hylan, Miller fashioned the law creating the New York City Transit Commission. He found the death penalty necessary, and was against its abolition. In 1922, he was defeated in a bid for re-election by his predecessor Al Smith, whom he had unseated in 1920. Miller was a strong supporter of the Roman Catholic Church, his wife's religion, and converted to Catholicism on his deathbed. The Port Authority of New York and New Jersey was created while Miller was Governor.

Later career
From 1925 on he served as general counsel for U.S. Steel. He, like his old adversary Smith was active in the American Liberty League, a bipartisan anti-New Deal group founded by wealthy conservatives. While Miller was still the leading partner at his law firm in 1938, Carnegie's Pittsburgh Steamship Company named a ship "Governor Miller" in his honor.

Personal life
On November 23, 1896, he married Elizabeth Davern, and they had seven daughters. They resided at the Elmcroft Estate in Upper Brookville, New York.

Miller died in 1953 at his New York hotel residence after fracturing his hip following a vacation in Arizona. He was buried in Cortland at the historic Cortland Rural Cemetery.

Honors
In January 1952, the New York State Bar Association awarded Miller its first gold medal for "distinguished service to the legal profession."

References

Sources
Appointment as Comptroller, in New York Times (NYT)(December 31, 1901)
Appointment to the Supreme Court, in NYT (November 11, 1903)
Political Graveyard
His opinion on the death penalty, in NYT (May 1, 1921)
History of Court of Appeal

Further reading
 Doig, Jameson W. Empire on the Hudson: Entrepreneurial vision and political power at the Port of New York Authority (Columbia University Press, 2013)

External links

NGA.org, biography
Patspresidentialplaces.com, Pat's Presidential Places

1868 births
1953 deaths
Republican Party governors of New York (state)
Judges of the New York Court of Appeals
New York State Comptrollers
People from Cortland, New York
Converts to Roman Catholicism
New York Supreme Court Justices
Old Right (United States)
Catholics from New York (state)
People from Upper Brookville, New York